Sabuj Barman is a Bangladeshi cricketer. He made his first-class debut for Dhaka Division in the 2017–18 National Cricket League on 22 September 2017. He made his List A debut for Uttara Sporting Club  in the 2018–19 Dhaka Premier Division Cricket League on 7 April 2019.

References

External links
 

Year of birth missing (living people)
Living people
Bangladeshi cricketers
Place of birth missing (living people)
Dhaka Division cricketers
Uttara Sporting Club cricketers